Ryszard Skarbiński (born 28 February 1949) is a Polish sailor. He competed in the Finn event at the 1980 Summer Olympics.

References

External links
 

1949 births
Living people
Polish male sailors (sport)
Olympic sailors of Poland
Sailors at the 1980 Summer Olympics – Finn
Sportspeople from Poznań